Apericallia is a genus of moths in the family Geometridae. It was described by John Henry Leech in 1897 from seven species collected in western China in Moupin. The type species is Apericallia bilinearia.

References 

Ennominae
Geometridae genera

Taxa described in 1897